Asla Vazgeçmem (English title: Never Let Go) is a Turkish romantic drama television series, starring Tolgahan Sayışman, Amine Gülşe, Şafak Pekdemir, Ümit Yesin, Ayşegül Günay, Hülya Gülşen Irmak, Tugay Mercan and Taner Rumeli. It premiered on Show TV on February 12, 2015 and concluded on October 6, 2016.

Cast 
Tolgahan Sayışman as Yiğit Kozan
Amine Gülşe as Nur Demirağ Kozan
Şafak Pekdemir as İclal Demirer Kozan
Ayşegül Günay as Aytül Demirer
Yonca Cevher as Nazan Kozan
Tugay Mercan as Cahit Kozan
Hülya Gülşen as Hafize Çelebi
Ümit Yesin as Tayyar Çelebi
Tuğçe Kumral as Elmas Çelebi Kozan
Ege Kökenli as Yaren Kozan
Hakan Dinçkol as Fırat Kozan
Yağızkan Dikmen as Emin Çelebi
Poyraz Bayramoğlu as Mert Kozan
Şencan Güleryüz as Kerem Sancaktar
Eren Hacısalihoğlu as Sinan
Taner Rumeli as Fatih
Gözde Mutluer as Yağmur Kozan
Ferda İşil as Dudu
Zeynep Köse as Fikret

Series overview

References

External links 
  
 

2015 Turkish television series debuts
2016 Turkish television series endings
Turkish drama television series
Romance television series
Show TV original programming
Television shows set in Istanbul
Television series produced in Istanbul
Television series set in the 2010s